"Come Together" is a 1969 song by The Beatles.

Come Together may also refer to:

Film and television
 Come Together (film), a 1971 film directed by Saul Swimmer
 Come Together, a 2001 Canadian film by Jeff Macpherson
 Come Together: A Fashion Picture in Motion, a 2016 short film by Wes Anderson
 Come, Together, a 2016 South Korean film
 Come Together: A Night for John Lennon's Words and Music, a 2001 television program

Music
 Come Together Music Festival, in Sydney, Australia
 Come Together, the slogan of the Eurovision Song Contest 2016

Albums 
 Come Together (Ike & Tina Turner album), 1970
 Come Together (Third Day album), 2001
 Come Together: America Salutes the Beatles, a tribute album, 1995
 Come Together (EP), by Killing Floor, 1998
 Come Together, an unreleased album by Victoria Beckham
 Come Together: A Musical Experience in Love, by Jimmy and Carol Owens, 1972

Songs 
 "Come Together" (Primal Scream song), 1990
 "Come Together", by Annie from Anniemal
 "Come Together", by Blur from Leisure
 "Come Together", by Chris Brown from Indigo
 "Come Together", by Demi Lovato from Holy Fvck
 "Come Together", by Echosmith from Talking Dreams
 "Come Together", by The Isley Brothers from Spend the Night
 "Come Together", by MC5 from Kick Out the Jams
 "Come Together", by Move from Synergy
 "Come Together", by Ongaku Gatas
 "Come Together", by Pnau from Pnau
 "Come Together", by Spiritualized from Ladies and Gentlemen We Are Floating in Space
 "Come2gether", by Crystal Method from the compilation album Mortal Kombat: More Kombat